John Lloyd Chipembere Lwanda (born 1949) is a Malawian medical doctor, writer, poet, researcher, publisher, and music producer. He is a published author and also a publisher of books and music. He was an honorary senior lecturer at the University of Glasgow Department of Primary Care until 2005. Lwanda did his history and social science PhD at the University of Edinburgh's Centre of African Studies.

Education
Lwanda was educated in Zimbabwe (1956–1958), Malawi (1958–1969) and Scotland at Anglican, Catholic, and Presbyterian schools and colleges. He spent a politically and musically influential elective year in the US in 1974. Though he had intended to pursue the arts, his father advised him to take up medicine. Graduating in medicine in 1976, he specialised in paediatrics before turning to adult general medicine.

Career
He has worked as a Census Enumerator for the Malawi National Census 1966 and as a clerk in the Ministry of Education between  1967 and 1968 under Brian McLaughlin. At the University of Malawi (1969–1970) he was a Senior Laboratory Assistant working under Professors Peter Mwanza and Margaret Kalk. He has studied and worked in Scotland since 1970 and, briefly, Malawi as a government doctor and lecturer at the College of Medicine. He has also worked in various medical fields since. He is currently a general medical practitioner in Lanarkshire and is an honorary senior research fellow in the Institute of Health and Wellbeing, School of Politics and Social Science, Glasgow University. Although his first article was published in Moni magazine in 1965, he only began working regularly as a Freelance writer and journalist from 1981. He, by default, became a Music and Book Researcher and Publisher in 1988. Between 1991 and 1994 he was involved in the activism that led to a multiparty dispensation in Malawi  Lwanda describes music as his first love

Publishing career

Pamtondo
Pamtondo was set up in 1988 by John Lwanda and George Claver with the aim of recording and disseminating Malawi music. It recorded and issued a number of releases of Malawi music, including recordings by Kasambwe, Alan Namoko and Chimvu, Saleta Phiri and AB Sounds, CheChamba, Kamwendo Brothers Band, as well as co-operating on some compilations.

Pamvision
Since 1994 Pamvision has been making Malawian music video recordings and films. The first recording was of Chief Chipoka Band (1994). Over twenty five different acts, ranging from gospel through popular music to traditional, have been video recorded, mostly for academic research. These include the Malawi National Dance Troupe, the Mount Sinai Choir (contemporary urban gospel), Sambangoma Dance Troupe (urban traditional dance and music troupe), Bondo Village Nyau Group (Chewa traditional dance and music), Kwandege Cultural Troupe, Chileka (traditional village ensemble), and the Mchinji Ingoma Troupe (Ngoni traditional dance and music).

Dudu Nsomba Publications
Established in 1993, Dudu Nsomba Publications publishes books on Malawi and Africa. Dudu Nsomba supports the Copyright Society of Malawi. The first book was Kamuzu Banda of Malawi (1993).

Books Edited and Published by Dudu Nsomba
Cry of the Fish Eagle by Wilfred Plumbe, 1997. 
 Living my destiny by Austin C Mkandawire, 1997. 
 Living dangerously by Patrick O'Malley, 1998 
Yoranivyoto by Felix Mnthali, 1998  .
 Suffering in Silence by Emily Mkamanga, 2000. 
The state and the labour movement in Malawi by Almiton Zeleza Manda, 2000 
Old Watering Holes: Mayo to Serabu by Hilary Lyons, 2001. 
Malawian choral compositions by Mjura Mkandawire, 2011. 
The trial of Jack Mapanje: a play by Steven Ndhlovu, 2009. 
Mistaken identity by Richard Duwa, 2009. 
Yuraia Chatonda Chirwa: the faithful servant by Austin Mkandawire

Published works

Books
Kamuzu Banda of Malawi: Promise, Power and Legacy (Kachere Publishing)-2010
The Rhino's Lament (Poetry, Dudu Nsomba) -2008. 
Music, Culture and Orature: Reading the Malawi public sphere, 1949–2006. (Kachere Publishing)- 2008. 
Colour, class and culture: A preliminary communication into the creation of doctors in Malawi, 2008. Dudu Nsomba 
Politics, Culture and Medicine in Malawi (Kachere)-2005. 
Promises, Power Politics and Poverty: Democratic Transition in Malawi, 1961–1999 (Dudu Nsomba)- 1996. 
The second harvest (Novel, Dudu Nsomba)- 1994. 
Black thoughts from the Diaspora (Poetry, Dudu Nsomba)- 1994. 
Malawi: the state we are in? Montfort Media  This is a book that addresses the current state of politics in Malawi in 2019.

Book chapters
2019. Afroma, Mbumba, Kwasa kwasa, Ingoma, Malipenga, Gule wamkulu, Reggae, Jazz Band in Malawi. In Bloomsbury Encyclopaedia of Sub-Saharan Africa.
 "Music and Social Protest (Malawi)", In J. H. Downing (Editor) Encyclopaedia of Social Movement Media. Sage, 2010
 "The informal and traditional: education for brain drain in Malawi’"In M. Beveridge, K. King, R. Palmer and R. Wedgewood (Eds) Reintegrating Education, skills and work in Africa: towards informal or knowledge economics?: Centre of African Studies, 2005.
 "Changes in the Malawi Political landscape between 1994 and 2004: Nkhope ya Agalatia" in Ott, Immink and Bhatupe The power of the vote: Malawi's 2004 parliamentary and presidential Elections, Zomba: Kachere, 2004.
 "Historical ruptures and continuities in the HIV/Aids story" In Kalipeni, E; Craddock, S.; Oppong, J. and Ghosh, J. eds. HIV/AIDS in Africa: Beyond Epidemiology. Oxford: Blackwell Publishers, 2004.
 "Tikutha: the political culture of the HIV/AIDS epidemic in Malawi".2002 In Englund, H (Ed) Democracy of Chameleons. Zomba: Kachere.
 African Issues: The African "Brain Drain" to the North: Pitfalls and Possibilities, Vol. 30, No. 1, 2002 (Published by: African Studies Association)
 "Malawi: Sounds Afroma". In World Music: the Rough Guide, London: Penguin, p 210 – 218, 2006.
2015 ‘Poverty, prophets and politics: ‘Marxist’ discourses in Malawi music, 1994 – 2012’. In Abiodun Salawu and Monica Chibita (eds). A Book of Readings: Indigenous language media, language politics and democracy in Africa. Basingstoke: Macmillan Palgrave.
2012. ‘Memory and Music: memorializing the Malawi Martyrs’ In KM Phiri, J McCracken and WO Mulwafu (eds) Malawi in Crisis: the 1959/60 Nyasaland State of Emergency and its Legacy. Zomba: Kachere, Chapter 17.
2011. ‘Edzi ndi dolo: singing aids in Malawi 1980 – 2008’ In Gregory Barz and Judah M. Cohen, (eds) The Culture of AIDS in Africa: Hope and Healing Through Music and the Arts New York: Oxford University Press, chapter 31.
2011. ‘Music and Social Protest in Malawi’ In D. H. Downey (ed) Encyclopedia of Social Movement media London: Sage Publications, pages 347 - 351.
2004: Changes in the Malawi Political landscape between 1994 and 2004’: Nkhope ya Agalatia in ‘The power of the vote: Malawi’s 2004 parliamentary and presidential Elections, Zomba: Kachere, pages 49 -86.
2004. ‘Historical ruptures and continuities in the HIV/Aids story’. In Kalipeni, E.; Craddock, S.; Oppong, J. and Ghosh, J. eds. HIV/AIDS in Africa: Beyond Epidemiology. Oxford: Blackwell Publishers, pages 29 – 42.

Journal articles

Family
Lwanda, who sometimes describes himself as a subsistence farmer, has three grand children: Evelyn Onani, Muliko, and Tazilwa.

References

Malawian general practitioners
Malawian academics
Malawian historians
Malawian educators
Living people
1948 births
Malawian poets
Alumni of the University of Edinburgh
20th-century Malawian writers
21st-century Malawian writers
Academics of the University of Glasgow